Gada River may refer to:

 Gada, a tributary of the Bâsca Mică in Buzău County, Romania
 Gada - tributary of the Feernic in Harghita County, Romania
 Gada River (Nigeria) - a river in Nigeria
 Gada River (Uele), a river in Haut-Uelé province of the Democratic Republic of the Congo

See also 
 Gada (disambiguation)